Groși is a commune in Maramureș County, Romania.

Groşi may also refer to several other places in Romania:

 Groşi, a village in Ceru-Băcăinți Commune, Alba County
 Groşi, a village in Vârfurile Commune, Arad County
 Groşi, a village in Băbana Commune, Argeș County
 Groşi, a village in Aușeu Commune, Bihor County
 Groşi, a village in Brusturi Commune, Neamţ County
 Groşi, a village in Margina Commune, Timiș County
 Groşi, a village in Cernișoara Commune, Vâlcea County

See also
 Groș (disambiguation)
 Groșii (disambiguation)
 Groșani (disambiguation)
 Grosu